Hatvan  is a town in Heves county, Hungary. Hatvan is the Hungarian word for "sixty".

Etymology
Hatvan is the Hungarian word for "sixty". It is a common urban legend that the town got this name because it is 60 km from Budapest, but in fact the name is already mentioned in medieval sources, many years before the kilometre existed; also, the actual distance between the capital and the town is closer to 50 km.

Sport
The association football club FC Hatvan is based in Hatvan.

Twin towns – sister cities

Hatvan is twinned with:

 Barberino Tavarnelle, Italy
 Berehove, Ukraine 
 Ignalina, Lithuania
 Kokkola, Finland
 Maassluis, Netherlands
 Nižný Hrušov, Slovakia
 Prachatice, Czech Republic
 Østfold, Norway
 Târgu Secuiesc, Romania

Notable people
 

József Ágoston (1800–1860), lawyer and politian
Endre Gerelyes (1935–1973), writer and university professor

References

External links

 in Hungarian

Populated places in Heves County